Xintiandi (Shanghainese: Shinthidi lit. "New Heaven and Earth", fig. "New World") is an affluent car-free shopping, eating and entertainment district of Shanghai. Xintiandi now refers to the wider area centered around Madang Road which includes both pedestrian-only and motor traffic roads.

Overview
The district is composed of an area of reconstituted traditional mid-19th century shikumen ("stone gate") houses on narrow alleys, some adjoining houses which now serve as book stores, cafes and restaurants, and shopping malls.  Most of the cafes and restaurants feature both indoor and outdoor seating.  Xintiandi has an active nightlife on weekdays as well as weekends, though romantic settings are more common than loud music and dance places. It is considered one of the first lifestyle centers in China. It is also the most expensive place to live in China, with some apartments costing more than Tokyo, Singapore, New York and London. It is generally home to the Chinese elites and top executive expats or immigrants.

Xintiandi is the location of the site of the first congress of the Chinese Communist Party, which is now preserved at the Museum of the First National Congress of the Chinese Communist Party. Also nearby are the Shikumen Open House Museum and the site of the Provisional Government of the Republic of Korea when Korea was a Japanese colony.

Redevelopment
The area was developed by Shui On Land during the re-development of the surrounding area. Some houses in Xintiandi were then renovated in order to implant an art gallery, cafes, and restaurants. Many tour groups both domestic and from abroad also visit Xintiandi as one of the main attractions in Shanghai.

The Xintiandi redevelopment was also collaborated with global architecture firm Skidmore, Owings & Merrill, including with Benjamin T. Wood and Nikken Sekkei International. The urban renewal is considered one of the first examples of the placemaking approach in China.)

This construction displaced 3,500 Shanghainese families.

Transportation
The closest Shanghai Metro stations in the vicinity are South Huangpi Road Station (on Line 1), Xintiandi Station (on Line 10 and Line 13) and Madang Road Station (on Line 9 and Line 13).

See also
Tianzifang
50 Moganshan Road

References

External links

 www.shanghaixintiandi.com 
 Xintiandi redevelopment
 Xintiandi Architect

Neighbourhoods of Shanghai
Tourist attractions in Shanghai
Landmarks in Shanghai
Entertainment districts in China
Pedestrian malls in China
Huangpu District, Shanghai